A folkloric deity among the sect of Daryapanthi Sindhis, Jhulelal is the most revered deity of Sindhi  in modern South Asia.

Legends converge upon that Jhulelal was born during the rule of one Islamic despot "Mirkshah", who had issued an ultimatum to local sindhi for converting to Islam. The reincarnation of a sindhi deity, Jhulelal exhibited supernatural powers since childhood; he preached about how the Muslims believed in the same God, and emphasized that the Koran forbade forced conversion. Ultimately, Jhulelal convinced the King to spare the Hindus and even gained devotees among the Muslims.

Devotion towards Jhulelal was not uniform in pre-partition Sindh; many Sindhi  had never heard of him and he was one of the many deities belonging to the Sindhi cultural pantheon. Devotional songs were penned, pamphlets printed, statues installed, festivals celebrated, and cultural events organized in thousands for the cause of Jhulelal. Over the course of decades, Jhulelal has successfully become the representative God of Sindhis.Iconography of Jhulelal varies widely. Sindhi Hindus worship Jhulelal at the Shrine at Odero Lal in Pakistan's Sindh province, which is jointly used by sindhi, and Sindhi Muslims who revere the shrine as the tomb of Sheikh Tahir. A second shrine named Jhulelal Tirthdham exists in India at Narayan Sarovar, Kutch, Gujarat.

Folklore

 Rough summary 
After a long period of harmonious existence between the Hindus and Muslims, one Mirkshah of Thatta ascended the throne. Instigated by his advisors, he ordered that all local Hindus convert to Islam or be put to death. The Hindus prayed to Indus, who promised that Varuna will take the form of a child and avert the impending catastrophe.

In 1007, the day of Cheti Chand in Chaitra, one Uderolal was born to a local Hindu family. As he began to be worshiped, Mirkshah sent his ministers to investigate who witnessed various strange events. The child metamorphosed into a young warrior, then into an old man, before back to child; at other times, he swam upstream on a fish. Mirkshah grew afraid but his advisors coerced him to hold stead.

Soon, he went to meet Uderolal and was impressed by his understanding of Islam — Uderolal preached about how the Hindus and Muslims believed in the same God, and the Koran forbade conversion. However, his advisors suggested that his teachings be disregarded and Uderolal imprisoned. When the guards proceeded to arrest him, an inferno and a flood engulfed his palaces. Mirkshah relented, abolished his decree, and asked for forgiveness from Uderolal.

As the palace was saved and harmony restored, Jhulelal gained devotees even among the Muslims (including Mirkshah). Jhulelal requested that a flame be burnt for eternity, in the memory of his deeds, before leaving his earthly avatar.

 Variant readings 
The myth of Jhulelal is not seen in regional histories written prior to the 20th century. While all Jhulelal legends broadly revolve around two themes — the valorization of Sindhi communal harmony and the intrinsic superiority of tolerant and devout Hindus over Muslims who weren't even able to interpret their own religious texts —  the specifics vary widely and have even been a site of internal contestation among Sindhi Hindus. Moreover Sindhi Muslims have forged their own legends concerning Jhulelal.

 Hindus 
The birth-name varies from Uderolal to Amarlal to Daryasahib; the event of his first appearance is either noted to be from a human birth or from the Indus, riding on a fish. He is variously noted as an avatara'' of Vishnu or a manifestation of Varuna; one conflates the two to deem him as the Varuna avatara of Vishnu. How he came to be known as Jhulelal attracts another set of fascinating claims. The transpirings that arose out of his encounter with Mirkshah varies — some claim that the King had submitted long ago in the face of his supernatural powers while others claim that Jhule Lal led a secretly gathered force to victory in an old-school war.

The presentation of the narrative differs too. Many renderings choose to emphasize on the cruelty of Muslim rulers against Brahmins (and Hindus, by extension) — a column in Indian Express had projected contemporary Hindu Nationalism onto the narrative with Jhule Lal "fill[ing] the shrinking Hindus with courage" and "put[ting] holy terror into the persecuting Muslims" while some Sindhis have transplanted Jhulelal into the reign of Aurangzeb, a ruler notoriously renowned in public memory for being the worst persecutor of Hindus. Some choose to emphasize on the Hinduness of Jhulelal drawing tenuous connections with Vedic corpus.

Muslims 
Jhulelal is declared to be Khwaja Khizr.

Festivals

Cheti Chand
The Cheti Chand festival in the month of Chaitra, marks the arrival of spring and harvest, as well as the mythical birth of Uderolal in the year 1007. Uderolal morphed into a warrior and old man who preached and reprimanded Mirkhshah that Muslims and Hindus deserve the same religious freedoms. He, as Jhulelal, became the saviour of the Sindhi Hindus, who according to this legend, celebrate the new year as Uderolal's birthday.

Chaliya saheb
Chalio or Chaliho, also called Chaliho Sahib, is a forty-day-long festival celebrated by Sindhi Hindus to express their gratitude to Jhulelal for saving them from their impending conversion to Islam. The festival is observed every year in the months of July to August; dates vary according to Hindu calendar. It is a thanksgiving celebration in honor of Varuna Deva for listening to their prayers.

Shrines

Odero Lal Shrine

The Jhulelal Shrine at Odero Lal is situated in Matiari District, almost 40 kilometers away from the Sanghar District of Sindh; The Hindus and the Muslims can pray here at the same place simultaneously. Nawabshah, Hyderabad, Matiari, Sanghar and Mirpur Khas are the nearby major cities to reach at the Shrine near Tando Adam.

It forms the seat of the Daryapanthis, originally a subsect of the followers of Gorakhnath, who belong to the Nath tradition.

Jhulelal Tirthdham
Sindhi Hindus in India built a religious shrine and cultural complex in Kutch, near the border of Sindh Province. The 100-acre complex includes a 100-foot statue of Lord Jhulelal, a museum, meditation centre, an auditorium, and a cultural and arts-and-crafts centre with 100 accommodations. Aiming to be the "a centre for global Sindhi identity", the project costs an estimated ₹100 crore and was built on the donations from wealthy Indian Sindhis. Harish Fabiani, one of the key promoters of the project, stated regarding the cultural complex, "The younger generation is aware they are Sindhis, but they do not know their language. We must learn our language and culture. We should have a place we can call our own."

Iconography
 In the most common form, Jhulelal is represented as a bearded man sitting cross-legged on a lotus flower that rests on a palla fish. The fish is seen floating on the Sindhu river. He holds a sacred text and sometimes even a rosary. He wears a golden crown with a peacock feather and wears regal clothes. Generally, temple idols represent him in this form.
 In another form, he is shown standing on a palla fish or the lotus flower, holding a staff with both hands to indicate leadership.

Notes

See also
 Cheti Chand
 Darya Lal Mandir
 Shri Varun Dev Mandir

References

External links
 All About Sindhis
 Jhule Lal
 Sindhi Deity Jhulelal

Regional Hindu gods
Hindu folk deities
Hinduism in Sindh
Sindhi people
Sindhi Hindu saints